The Battle of Dadaejin and the Siege of Busan were the first battles of the Japanese invasions of Korea (1592–1598) and occurred simultaneously on April 13–14, 1592 (Gregorian: May 23–24, 1592).

Background
The Japanese invasion force consisting of 400 transports bearing 18,700 men under the command of Konishi Yukinaga departed from Tsushima Island on April 13 (Gregorian: May 23) and arrived at Busan harbor without any incident, and the Japanese commenced landing operations from 0400 the following morning.

The commanders of the Japanese forces were Konishi, Sō Yoshitoshi,  Matsura Shigenobu, Arima Harunobu, Ōmura Yoshiaki and Gotō Mototsugu, all of whom (with the exception of Matsura) were Kirishitans, as were many of their men. While Sō Yoshitoshi attacked Busan, Konishi led a smaller force against the fort of Dadaejin, located a few kilometers to the southwest of Busan at the mouth of the Nantong River.

Battle
Konishi Yukinaga's first attack was repelled by Yun Heungsin. The second attack came at night when Japanese forces filled the moat with rocks and lumber under cover of gunfire before scaling the walls using bamboo ladders. The entire garrison was massacred.

Aftermath
The following day, Konishi and Sō recombined their forces, and then advanced towards the fortress of Dongnae located ten kilometers northeast on the main road to Seoul.

See also
Japanese invasions of Korea (1592–1598)
List of battles during the Japanese invasions of Korea (1592–1598)
Timeline of the Japanese invasions of Korea

References

Bibliography

 
 
 
 
 
 
 
 
 
 
 桑田忠親 [Kuwata, Tadachika], ed., 舊參謀本部編纂, [Kyu Sanbo Honbu], 朝鮮の役 [Chousen no Eki]　(日本の戰史 [Nihon no Senshi] Vol. 5), 1965.
 
 
 
 
 
 
 
 
 
 
 
 
  
 
 
 
 
 
 

Dadaejin
1592 in Asia
1592 in Japan
Dadaejin
Dadaejin